A sand wave is a lower regime sedimentary structure that forms across from tidal currents.

Formation 
Sand waves are formed through the action of the wind or water (through waves or tidal currents).

Sand waves form also underwater.

See also 
 Sand dune
 Ripple marks

References

External links 

Sedimentology
Patterned grounds
Sedimentary structures